Papaipema eupatorii, known generally as the Joe-Pye-weed borer or eupatorium borer, is a species of cutworm or dart moth in the family Noctuidae. It is found in North America.

The MONA or Hodges number for Papaipema eupatorii is 9501.

References

Further reading

External links

 

Papaipema
Articles created by Qbugbot
Moths described in 1905
Moths of North America